Santibáñez de Esgueva is a municipality and town in the Province of Burgos, Castile and León, Spain. According to the 2004 census ([[Instituto Nacional de Estadística 
(Spain)|INE]]), the municipality has a population of 148 inhabitants.

References

Municipalities in the Province of Burgos